The Coupe de la Ligue was a knockout cup competition in French football organised by the Ligue de Football Professionnel and comprises clubs of France's top football division, Ligue 1, France's second division, Ligue 2, and the third division, the Championnat National. The current competition was established relatively late in 1994 but another competition named Coupe de la Ligue existed from 1963 to 1965 and in 1982, a Coupe d'Été (later also called Coupe de la Ligue) was held before the start of the French league season. It was abolished after the 2019–20 season to reduce fixture congestion.

The most successful club in the history of the modern Coupe de la Ligue was Paris Saint-Germain, who won the cup nine times. Paris Saint-Germain also made the most appearances in the final, with ten. The venue for the final was the Parc des Princes for its first three years, until it was moved to the Stade de France. In September 2016, the LFP voted for the next three finals to be at Parc Olympique Lyonnais in Lyon, the Nouveau Stade de Bordeaux in Bordeaux, and the Stade Pierre-Mauroy in Lille, respectively. In 2000, Gueugnon became the first team outside the top French league to win the tournament.

Previous formats (since 1963–1994)

Coupe de la Ligue (1963–1965)

Coupe d'Été/Coupe de la Ligue (1982–1994)

Finals (since 1995)

Key

Performance by team 
The statistics includes all predecessors (marked in italics).

Notes

A. : Reims won the 1991 final 4–3 in a penalty shoot-out.
B. : Metz won the 1996 final 5–4 in a penalty shoot-out.
C. : Strasbourg won the 1997 final 6–5 in a penalty shoot-out.
D. : Paris Saint-Germain won the 1998 final 4–2 in a penalty shoot-out.
E. : Sochaux won the 2004 final 5–4 in a penalty shoot-out.
F. : Strasbourg won the 2019 final 4–1 in a penalty shoot-out.
G. : Paris Saint-Germain won the 2020 final 6–5 in a penalty shoot-out.

References
General

Specific

External links

Coupe de la Ligue website

 
Coupe de la Ligue
Association football in France lists